Geraldine Feeney (born 9 September 1957) is a former Irish Fianna Fáil politician, who was a member of Seanad Éireann from 2002 to 2011. After standing unsuccessfully on the Cultural and Educational Panel in 1997, she was first elected by the Labour Panel in 2002 and was re-elected in 2007. She lost her seat at the 2011 Seanad election.

She took up a position as an ordinary member for the Standards in Public Office Commission on 10 December 2020.

References

1957 births
Living people
Alumni of the University of Galway
Fianna Fáil senators
Members of the 22nd Seanad
Members of the 23rd Seanad
21st-century women members of Seanad Éireann
Politicians from County Offaly
Politicians from County Sligo